Ulyanovsk Baratayevka Airport (also Ulyanovsk Southwest Airport and Ul'yanovsk Airport)  is an airport in Russia located  southwest of Ulyanovsk. It generally operates as a civilian/transport base.

Towards the end of the Cold War there has been an OVTAP (Independent Military Transport Aviation Regiment) located on the field with Ilyushin Il-76 and Antonov An-22 aircraft.

During April 2013, a terminal remodel was completed to accommodate a steady increase in passenger traffic to the area, resulting from increased corporate investment in the Ulyanovsk area.

Ulyanovsk Aircraft Museum is located near the airport, exposition includes the Tupolev Tu-144 supersonic aircraft (reg. no. SSSR-77110).

Airlines and destinations

See also
 Ulyanovsk Vostochny Airport
 Samara Kurumoch Airport

References

External links

 Ulyanovsk (Baratayevka) International Airport official website 
 
 

Soviet Air Force bases
Soviet Military Transport Aviation
Russian Air Force bases
Airports built in the Soviet Union
Airports in Ulyanovsk Oblast